Luca Mosti (born 23 May 1998) is an Italian professional footballer who plays as a right back for Serie D club PDHAE.

Club career
On 22 July 2019, he returned to Arezzo, signing a 3-year contract. On 31 January 2020, he was loaned to Pergolettese for the rest of the season. His contract with Arezzo was terminated on 27 November 2020.

On 25 February 2021, he signed with Fermana.

References

External links

1998 births
People from Massa
Sportspeople from the Province of Massa-Carrara
Living people
Italian footballers
Association football defenders
ACF Fiorentina players
S.S. Arezzo players
A.S. Bisceglie Calcio 1913 players
U.S. Pergolettese 1932 players
Fermana F.C. players
Serie C players
Serie D players
Footballers from Tuscany